The 2012 Suruga Bank Championship was the fifth edition of the Suruga Bank Championship, the club football match co-organized by the Japan Football Association, the football governing body of Japan, and CONMEBOL, the football governing body of South America, between the winners of the previous season's J.League Cup and Copa Sudamericana. It was contested by Japanese club Kashima Antlers, the 2011 J.League Cup champion, and Chilean club Universidad de Chile, the 2011 Copa Sudamericana champion.

Kashima Antlers won 7–6 in penalty shootout, after drawing 2–2 in the ninety minutes of play.

Qualified teams

Rules
The Suruga Bank Championship is played over one match, hosted by the winner of the J.League Cup. If the score is tied at the end of regulation, the winner is determined by a penalty shootout (no extra time is played). A maximum of seven substitutions may be made during the match.

Match details

References

External links
Official webpage, J.League 
Official webpage, CONMEBOL 

2012 in South American football
2012
2012 in Japanese football
Club Universidad de Chile matches
Kashima Antlers matches
Association football penalty shoot-outs
2012 in Chilean football